Daniele Amadeo Tiatto (born 22 May 1973) is an Australian former soccer player who played as a winger and left back,

He notably played for Manchester City joining the club in 1998 whilst the club were playing in the third level of English football, he was promoted three times with City in his six years with the club and would go on to play in the Premier League for them. He also played in England for Leicester City and Stoke City, and took in spells in Europe with Salernitana and FC Baden. In his native country he has played for Bulleen Lions, Melbourne Knights, Brisbane Roar, St Albans Saints, Werribee City and Point Cook. He was capped 23 times by Australia scoring a single goal.

Club career

Early years
Tiatto commenced his senior career with Bulleen in the Victorian Premier League (VPL), eventually impressing enough to secure a move to the National Soccer League with Melbourne Knights. There he signalled his ability as a dashing left winger, helping the Knights in their golden era as they claimed back-to-back championships. In 1996, he joined Salernitana of the Italian Serie B on a temporary basis, but did not earn a permanent contract. A spell at Swiss club FC Baden followed, before Tiatto moved to the English club Stoke City on loan on 25 November 1997. He played 15 times for Stoke in 1997–98 scoring once which came in a 2–1 defeat at home to Huddersfield Town on 7 March 1998.

Manchester City
In the summer of 1998 Tiatto was signed by Manchester City for a fee of £300,000. Tiatto struggled to hold down a first team place during his first season at Manchester City, partially due to indiscipline. The next season was more successful for Tiatto, making 35 appearances as Manchester City gained promotion to the Premiership. The 2000–01 season saw Manchester City relegated, however, Tiatto performed well for the struggling club leading to speculation he would move on to another Premiership team. He also won Manchester City's Player of the Year award for the season. The 2001–02 season saw Tiatto again form part of a promotion winning side. On the return to the top division Tiatto again found his first team opportunities limited. A sending off against Blackburn Rovers six minutes after coming on a substitute resulted in a long exile from the first team. Injuries also restricted appearances, with Tiatto making just 13 starts in the final two years of his time at Manchester City. Tiatto signed for Leicester City on a two-year deal in the summer of 2004, after his contract Manchester City expired.

Leicester City
Usually employed as a left-winger for Leicester City, Tiatto played anywhere down the left side, or in central midfield. He was a firm favourite with Leicester City fans and he was voted Leicester's 2005 Player of the Season by supporters. However, Tiatto had a bad season in the 2005–06 season, mainly due to indiscipline and injury.

Tiatto was the Leicester City club captain, having taken over the armband from Matt Elliott when the Scottish defender retired in 2005, before losing it to Paddy McCarthy at the end of the 2005–06 season.

Brisbane Roar
In February 2007, Tiatto signed a pre-contract agreement with Brisbane Roar FC in the Hyundai A-League for the 2007–08 season. On 1 July, Tiatto made his debut for the Roar coming on as a substitute against South African team Supersport United. Tiatto featured prominently in his sides two all draw against Adelaide United in Round One of the 2007–08 A-League season. However Tiatto was subsequently cited after the match for serious conduct relating to an ugly incident with Adelaide United defender Richie Alagich, and received a two match suspension.

During round 21, Tiatto scored his first goal for Brisbane Roar with a superb strike against Perth Glory. Soon after he threw his support behind axed keeper Liam Reddy to return in place of stand-in keeper Griffin McMaster for the A-League finals. He has been released from the Roar.

Melbourne Knights
After having a falling out with Roar coach Ange Postecoglou, Tiatto was sacked from Brisbane. However in 2010, he signed a one-year deal with VPL club Melbourne Knights, the club he played for before moving overseas. He later played for St Albans Saints and Werribee City.

International career
Tiatto won 25 caps for the Australian national team (scoring 1 goal) before his retirement from international football in October 2005. He also represented Australia at under 23 level when he played at the 1996 Olympic Games.

Career statistics

Club
Sources:

A.  The "Other" column constitutes appearances and goals in the Football League Trophy (1998) and the UEFA Cup (2003).

International
Source:

Honours
Australia
 OFC Nations Cup: 1996, 2000

Melbourne Knights
 NSL Championship: 1994-1995, 1995–1996

Individual
 Queensland Roar Member's Player of the Year: 2007-2008

References

External links
 Queensland Roar profile
 Oz Football profile

1973 births
Living people
Association football defenders
Soccer players from Melbourne
Australian people of Italian descent
Australian expatriate soccer players
Australia international soccer players
Olympic soccer players of Australia
Footballers at the 1996 Summer Olympics
A-League Men players
Premier League players
Serie B players
FC Baden players
Leicester City F.C. players
Manchester City F.C. players
Melbourne Knights FC players
Brisbane Roar FC players
U.S. Salernitana 1919 players
Stoke City F.C. players
Whittlesea Zebras players
Expatriate footballers in England
Expatriate footballers in Italy
Australian expatriate sportspeople in England
Australian expatriate sportspeople in Italy
English Football League players
1996 OFC Nations Cup players
2000 OFC Nations Cup players
Western Eagles FC players
Australian soccer players
Point Cook SC players
People from Werribee, Victoria